The nadir of American race relations was the period in African-American history and the history of the United States from the end of Reconstruction in 1877 through the early 20th century, when racism in the country, especially anti-black racism, was more open and pronounced than it had ever been during any other period in the nation's history. During this period, African Americans lost access to many of the civil rights which they had gained during Reconstruction. Anti-black violence, lynchings, segregation, legalized racial discrimination, and expressions of white supremacy all increased.

Historian Rayford Logan coined the phrase in his 1954 book The Negro in American Life and Thought: The Nadir, 1877–1901. Logan tried to determine the period when "the Negro's status in American society" reached its lowest point. He argued for 1901 as its end, suggesting that race relations improved after that year; other historians, such as John Hope Franklin and Henry Arthur Callis, argued for dates as late as 1923.

The term continues to be used; most notably, it is used in books by James W. Loewen as recently as 2006, and it is also used in books by other scholars. Loewen chooses later dates, arguing that the post-Reconstruction era was in fact one of widespread hope for racial equity due to idealistic Northern support for civil rights. In Loewen's view, the true nadir only began when Northern Republicans ceased supporting Southern blacks' rights around 1890, and it lasted until the United States entered World War II in 1941. This period followed the financial Panic of 1873 and a continuing decline in cotton prices. It overlapped with both the Gilded Age and the Progressive Era, and was characterized by the nationwide sundown town phenomenon.

Logan's focus was exclusively on African Americans in the Southern United States, but the time period which he covered also represents the worst period of anti-Chinese discrimination and wider anti-East Asian discrimination which was due to fear of the so-called Yellow Peril, which included harassment and violence on the West Coast of the United States, such as the destruction of Chinatown, Denver as well as anti-East Asian discrimination in Canada, particularly after the passage of the Chinese Exclusion Act of 1882.

Background

Reconstruction revisionism

In the early part of the 20th century, some white historians put forth the claim that Reconstruction was a tragic period, when Republicans who were motivated by revenge and profit used troops to force Southerners to accept corrupt governments that were run by unscrupulous Northerners and unqualified blacks. Such scholars generally dismissed the idea that blacks could ever be capable of governing societies.

Notable proponents of this view were referred to as the Dunning School, named after William Archibald Dunning, an influential historian at Columbia University. Another Columbia professor, John Burgess, was notorious for writing that "black skin means membership in a race of men which has never of itself... created any civilization of any kind."

The Dunning School's view of Reconstruction held sway for years. It was represented in D. W. Griffith's popular movie The Birth of a Nation (1915) and to some extent, it was also represented in Margaret Mitchell's novel Gone with the Wind (1934). More recent historians of the period have rejected many of the Dunning School's conclusions, and in their place, they offer a different assessment.

History of Reconstruction

Today's consensus regards Reconstruction as a time of idealism and hope, a time which was marked by some practical achievements. The Radical Republicans who passed the Fourteenth and Fifteenth Amendments were, for the most part, motivated by a desire to help freedmen. African-American historian W. E. B. Du Bois put this view forward in 1910, and later historians Kenneth Stampp and Eric Foner expanded it. The Republican Reconstruction governments had their share of corruption, but they benefited many whites, and were no more corrupt than Democratic governments or Northern Republican governments.

Furthermore, the Reconstruction governments established public education and social welfare institutions for the first time, improving education for both blacks and whites, and they also tried to improve social conditions for the many people who were left in poverty after the long war. No Reconstruction state government was dominated by blacks; in fact, blacks did not attain a level of representation which was equal to the size of their population in any state.

Origins

Reconstruction era violence 

For several years after the war, the federal government, pushed by Northern opinion, showed that it was willing to intervene in order to protect the rights of black Americans. There were limits, however, to Republican efforts on behalf of blacks: in Washington, a proposal of land reform made by the Freedmen's Bureau which would have granted blacks plots on the plantation land (forty acres and a mule) they worked never came to pass. In the South, many former Confederates were stripped of the right to vote, but they resisted Reconstruction with violence and intimidation. James Loewen notes that between 1865 and 1867, when white Democrats controlled the government, whites murdered an average of one black person every day in Hinds County, Mississippi. Black schools were especially targeted: school buildings were frequently burned and teachers were flogged and occasionally murdered. The postwar terrorist group the Ku Klux Klan (KKK) acted with significant local support, attacking freedmen and their white allies; the group was largely suppressed by federal efforts under the Enforcement Acts of 1870–1871, but did not disappear and had a resurgence in the early 20th century.

Despite these failures, however, blacks continued to vote and attend schools. Literacy soared, and many African-Americans were elected to local and statewide offices, with several serving in Congress. Because of the black community's commitment to education, the majority of blacks were literate by 1900.

Continued violence in the South, especially heated around electoral campaigns, sapped Northern intentions. More significantly, after the long years and losses of the Civil War, Northerners had lost heart for the massive commitment of money and arms that would have been required to stifle the white insurgency. The financial panic of 1873 disrupted the economy nationwide, causing more difficulties. The white insurgency took on new life ten years after the war. Conservative white Democrats waged an increasingly violent campaign, with the Colfax and Coushatta massacres in Louisiana in 1873 as signs. The next year saw the formation of paramilitary groups, such as the White League in Louisiana (1874) and Red Shirts in Mississippi and the Carolinas, that worked openly to turn Republicans out of office, disrupt black organizing, and intimidate and suppress black voting. They invited press coverage. One historian described them as "the military arm of the Democratic Party."

In 1874, in a continuation of the disputed gubernatorial election of 1872, thousands of White League militiamen fought against New Orleans police and Louisiana state militia and won. They turned out the Republican governor and installed the Democrat Samuel D. McEnery, took over the capitol, state house and armory for a few days, and then retreated in the face of Federal troops. This was known as the "Battle of Liberty Place".

End of Reconstruction 

Northerners waffled and finally capitulated to the South, giving up on being able to control election violence. Abolitionist leaders like Horace Greeley began to ally themselves with Democrats in attacking Reconstruction governments. By 1875, there was a Democratic majority in the House of Representatives. President Ulysses S. Grant, who as a general had led the Union to victory in the Civil War, initially refused to send troops to Mississippi in 1875 when the governor of the state asked him to. Violence surrounded the presidential election of 1876 in many areas, beginning a trend. After Grant, it would be many years before any President would do anything to extend the protection of the law to black people.

Jim Crow laws and terrorism

White supremacy 

As noted above, white paramilitary forces contributed to whites' taking over power in the late 1870s. A brief coalition of populists took over in some states, but Democrats had returned to power after the 1880s. From 1890 to 1908, they proceeded to pass legislation and constitutional amendments to disenfranchise most blacks and many poor whites, with Mississippi and Louisiana creating new state constitutions in 1890 and 1895 respectively, to disenfranchise African Americans. Democrats used a combination of restrictions on voter registration and voting methods, such as poll taxes, literacy and residency requirements, and ballot box changes. The main push came from elite Democrats in the Solid South, where blacks were a majority of voters. The elite Democrats also acted to disenfranchise poor whites. African Americans were an absolute majority of the population in Louisiana, Mississippi and South Carolina, and represented more than 40% of the population in four other former Confederate states. Accordingly, many whites perceived African Americans as a major political threat, because in free and fair elections, they would hold the balance of power in a majority of the South. South Carolina U.S. Senator Ben Tillman proudly proclaimed in 1900, "We have done our level best [to prevent blacks from voting]... we have scratched our heads to find out how we could eliminate the last one of them. We stuffed ballot boxes. We shot them. We are not ashamed of it."

Conservative white Democratic governments passed Jim Crow legislation, creating a system of legal racial segregation in public and private facilities. Blacks were separated in schools and the few hospitals, were restricted in seating on trains, and had to use separate sections in some restaurants and public transportation systems. They were often barred from some stores, or forbidden to use lunchrooms, restrooms and fitting rooms. Because they could not vote, they could not serve on juries, which meant they had little if any legal recourse in the system. Between 1889 and 1922, as political disenfranchisement and segregation were being established, the National Association for the Advancement of Colored People (NAACP) calculates lynchings reached their worst level in history. Almost 3,500 people fell victim to lynching, almost all of them black men.

Lynchings

Historian James Loewen notes that lynching emphasized the powerlessness of blacks: "the defining characteristic of a lynching is that the murder takes place in public, so everyone knows who did it, yet the crime goes unpunished." African American civil rights activist Ida Bell Wells-Barnett conducted one of the first systematic studies of the subject. She documented that the most prevalent accusation against lynching victims was murder or attempted murder.  She found blacks were "lynched for anything or nothing" – for wife-beating, stealing hogs, being "saucy to white people", sleeping with a consenting white woman – for being in the wrong place at the wrong time.

Blacks who were economically successful faced reprisals or sanctions. When Richard Wright tried to train to become an optometrist and lens-grinder, the other men in the shop threatened him until he was forced to leave. In 1911 blacks were barred from participating in the Kentucky Derby because African Americans won more than half of the first twenty-eight races. Through violence and legal restrictions, whites often prevented blacks from working as common laborers, much less as skilled artisans or in the professions. Under such conditions, even the most ambitious and talented black person found it extremely difficult to advance.

This situation called the views of Booker T. Washington, the most prominent black leader during the early part of the nadir into question. He had argued that black people could better themselves by doing hard work and being thrifty. He believed that they had to master basic work before they went on to pursue college careers and professional aspirations. Washington believed that his programs trained blacks for the lives which they were likely to lead as well as for the jobs which they could get in the South.

However, as W. E. B. Du Bois stated...

..."it is utterly impossible, under modern competitive methods, for working men and property-owners to defend their rights and exist without the right of suffrage". Washington had always (though often clandestinely) supported the right of black suffrage, and had fought against disfranchisement laws in Georgia, Louisiana, and other Southern states. This included secretive funding of litigation resulting in Giles v. Harris, 189 U.S. 475 (1903), which lost due to Supreme Court reluctance to interfere with states' rights.

Great migration and national hostility

African American migration 
Many blacks left the South in an attempt to find better living and working conditions. In 1879, Logan notes, "some 40,000 Negroes virtually stampeded from Mississippi, Louisiana, Alabama, and Georgia for the Midwest." More significantly, beginning in about 1915, many blacks moved to Northern cities in what became known as the Great Migration. Through the 1930s, more than 1.5 million blacks would leave the South for better lives in the North, seeking work and the chance to escape from lynchings and legal segregation. While they faced difficulties, overall, they had better chances in the North. They had to make great cultural changes, as most went from rural areas to major industrial cities, and they also had to adjust from being rural workers to being urban workers. As an example, in its years of expansion, the Pennsylvania Railroad recruited tens of thousands of workers from the South. In the South, alarmed whites, worried that their labor force was leaving, often tried to block black migration.

Northern reactions
During the nadir, Northern areas struggled with upheaval and hostility. In the Midwest and West, many towns posted "sundown" warnings, threatening to kill African Americans who remained overnight. These "Sundown" towns also expelled African-Americans who had settled in those towns both before and during Reconstruction. Monuments to Confederate War dead were erected across the nation – in Montana, for example.

Black housing was often segregated in the North. There was competition for jobs and housing as blacks entered cities which were also the destination of millions of immigrants from eastern and southern Europe. As more blacks moved north, they encountered racism where they had to battle over territory, often against ethnic Irish, who were defending their power base. In some regions, blacks could not serve on juries. Blackface shows, in which whites dressed as blacks portrayed African Americans as ignorant clowns, were popular in North and South. The Supreme Court reflected conservative tendencies and did not overrule Southern constitutional changes resulting in disfranchisement. In 1896, the Court ruled in Plessy v. Ferguson that "separate but equal" facilities for blacks were constitutional; the Court was made up almost entirely of Northerners. However, equal facilities were rarely provided, as there was no state or federal legislation requiring them. It would not be until 58 years later, with Brown v. Board of Education (1954), that the Court recognized its 1896 error.

While there were critics in the scientific community such as Franz Boas, eugenics and scientific racism were promoted in academia by scientists Lothrop Stoddard and Madison Grant, who argued "scientific evidence" for the racial superiority of whites and thereby worked to justify racial segregation and second-class citizenship for blacks.

Ku Klux Klan
Numerous black people had voted for Democrat Woodrow Wilson in the 1912 election, based on his promise to work for them. Instead, he segregated government workplaces and employment in some agencies. The film The Birth of a Nation (1915), which celebrated the original Ku Klux Klan, was shown at the White House to President Wilson and his cabinet members. Writing in 1921 to Joseph Tumulty, Wilson said of the film "I have always felt that this was a very unfortunate production and I wish most sincerely that its production might be avoided, particularly in communities where there are so many colored people."

The Birth of a Nation resulted in the rebirth of the Klan, which in the 1920s had more power and influence than the original Klan ever did. In 1924, the Klan had four million members. It also controlled the governorship and a majority of the state legislature in Indiana, and exerted a powerful political influence in Arkansas, Oklahoma, California, Georgia, Oregon, and Texas.

Mob violence and massacres

In the years during and after World War I there were great social tensions in the nation. In addition to the Great Migration and immigration from Europe, African-American Army veterans, newly demobilized, sought jobs, and as trained soldiers, were less likely to acquiesce to discrimination. Massacres and attacks on blacks that developed out of strikes and economic competition occurred in Houston, Philadelphia, and East St. Louis in 1917.

In 1919, there were so many violent attacks in several major cities that the summer of that year became known as Red Summer. The Chicago race riot of 1919 erupted into mob violence for several days. It left 15 whites and 23 blacks dead, over 500 injured and more than 1,000 homeless. An investigation found that ethnic Irish, who had established their own power base earlier on the South Side, were heavily implicated in the riots. The 1921 Tulsa race massacre in Tulsa, Oklahoma, was even more deadly; white mobs invaded and burned the Greenwood district of Tulsa; 1,256 homes were destroyed and 39 people (26 black, 13 white) were confirmed killed, although recent investigations suggest that the number of black deaths could be considerably higher.

Legacy

Culture
Black literacy levels, which rose during Reconstruction, continued to increase through this period. The NAACP was established in 1909, and by 1920 the group won a few important anti-discrimination lawsuits. African Americans, such as Du Bois and Wells-Barnett, continued the tradition of advocacy, organizing, and journalism which helped spur abolitionism, and also developed new tactics that helped to spur the civil rights movement of the 1950s and 1960s. The Harlem Renaissance and the popularity of jazz music during the early part of the 20th century made many Americans more aware of black culture and more accepting of black celebrities.

Instability
Overall, however, the nadir was a disaster, certainly for black people. Foner points out:

...by the early twentieth century [racism] had become more deeply embedded in the nation's culture and politics than at any time since the beginning of the antislavery crusade and perhaps in our nation's entire history.

Similarly, Loewen argues that the family instability and crime which many sociologists have found in black communities can be traced, not to slavery, but to the nadir and its aftermath.

Foner noted that "none of Reconstruction's black officials created a family political dynasty" and concluded that the nadir "aborted the development of the South's black political leadership."

See also 

 Black Codes (United States)
 Jim Crow laws
 Civil rights movement (1865–1896)
 Civil rights movement (1896–1954)
 Sundown town
 Woodrow Wilson and race
 Destination Freedom – a 1948–1950 radio drama about important events and characters in American race-related history

References

Sources 

 
 
 
 
 
 
 
 
 
 
 
 

 James Baldwin, Nobody Knows My Name
 Richard N. Current, et al., American History: A Survey, 7th ed., New York: Alfred A. Knopf, 1987.
 W. E. B. Du Bois, The Souls of Black Folk
 Eric Foner, Reconstruction: America's Unfinished Revolution, New York: Harper and Row, 1988.
 James Loewen, Lies Across America, New York: Touchstone, 1999.
 James Loewen, Lies My Teacher Told Me, New York: Touchstone, 1995.
 James Loewen, Sundown Towns: A Hidden Dimension of American Racism, New York: The New York Press, 2005.
 Rayford Logan,The Betrayal of the Negro from Rutherford B. Hayes to Woodrow Wilson,, New York: Da Capo Press, 1997. (This is an expanded edition of Logan's 1954 book The Negro in American Life and Thought, The Nadir, 1877–1901)
 Alan Lomax interview with Memphis Slim, Big Bill Broonzy, and Sonny Boy Williamson on the album, Blues in the Mississippi Night, Rykodisc, 1990.
 Booker T. Washington, Up From Slavery, 1901
 Ida B. Wells-Barnett, A Red Record, 1895
 Richard Wright, Black Boy, Harper & Brothers, 1945
Additional resources
 

1877 establishments in the United States
1923 disestablishments in the United States
1950s neologisms
Eras of United States history
Gilded Age
History of racial segregation in the United States
Politics and race in the United States
Reconstruction Era